Omar Abu Fares (born 16 August 1984) is a Jordanian former swimmer, who specialized in backstroke and individual medley events. 

Abu Fares made his Olympic debut, as a 16-year-old, at the 2000 Summer Olympics in Sydney, where he competed in the men's 200 m individual medley. He rounded out the first heat to last place and fifty-sixth overall with a slowest time of 2:21.22.

At the 2004 Summer Olympics in Athens, Abu Fares qualified for his second Jordanian squad in the men's 100 m backstroke by receiving a Universality place from FINA in an invitation time of 1:00.34. Abu Fares still maintained his record for being one of the slowest swimmers from the preliminaries, as he finished the same heat in a time of 1:02.36.

References

1984 births
Living people
Jordanian male swimmers
Olympic swimmers of Jordan
Swimmers at the 2000 Summer Olympics
Swimmers at the 2004 Summer Olympics
Male backstroke swimmers
Male medley swimmers
Sportspeople from Amman